Firebrand is an upcoming historical drama film directed by Karim Aïnouz.

Premise
Centers around Katherine Parr, the sixth and final wife of Henry VIII.

Cast
 Alicia Vikander as Katherine Parr
 Jude Law as Henry VIII
 Sam Riley as Thomas Seymour
 Eddie Marsan as Edward Seymour
 Simon Russell Beale as Stephen Gardiner
 Erin Doherty as Anne Askew
 Ruby Bentall as Cat
 Bryony Hannah as Ellen
 Maia Jemmett as Dot
 Patsy Ferran as Princess Mary
 Junia Rees as Princess Elizabeth
 Hatty Heaney as Meredith

Production
The film was announced during the 2021 American Film Market. Karim Aïnouz was set to direct, with Michelle Williams and Jude Law cast to star. In March 2022, Alicia Vikander joined the cast, replacing Williams. In May, Sam Riley, Eddie Marsan, Simon Russell Beale and Erin Doherty were among the additional cast announced for the film.

Filming had begun by April 2022, with production taking place at Haddon Hall in Bakewell, Derbyshire until June.

References

External links
Firebrand at the Internet Movie Database

Upcoming films
British psychological horror films
Cultural depictions of Elizabeth I
Cultural depictions of Henry VIII
Films shot in Derbyshire
Films about Henry VIII